The Dead of Jaffa (Hametim shel yafo) is an Israeli drama film directed by Ram Loevy. The film premiered at the 2019 Jerusalem Film Festival. It was nominated for the Ophir Award for Best Film.

Plot

In The Dead of Jaffa, three siblings are snuck over from the West Bank into Jaffa, Israel to live with their alleged uncle George (Yussuf Abu Warda) and his wife Rita (Ruba Blal). Their mother is dead, and their father is in jail. The children are illegally smuggled through checkpoints and meet shocked Rita. George and Rita are a childless couple, so their arrival and the chance to be a mother excites her, whereas George fears being caught by the police that hunts down illegal immigrants from the west bank. As Israeli- Palestinians host illegal Palestinian children, they have to stay under the radar. The oldest of the three siblings, Talal (Jihad Babay) does not want to be compliant and hide from Israelis, so he rebels and moves independently. He finds an abandoned house behind Rita and Georges's residence. To scare Talal out of there, George tells him the ghosts of Jaffa’s dead live there. Talal is intrigued and shows his siblings the house and shares its history. At the time of the kids' arrival in Jaffa, an English filmmaker, Jerry (Johnny Phillips) is filming a movie on his parents' life in 1947 British-occupied Palestine using the port city as the setting. Jerry invites George to play the role of a Palestinian doctor claiming he is perfect for the role. As George works in his convenience store and prepares for the role, Rita stays home and tells the children about her sister Doris (Maysa Daw). Growing more and more attached to them, Rita takes the kids to the beach which they have never seen before, but they start to fear the police finding out about the children. Two of them go with George while Talal remains defiant. 

The dynamics of Rita's attachment to the children, Talal’s defiance, and George's involvement in Jerry’s film create tensions as the story unfolds. Talal's curiosity leads him out of George and Rita’s house down the streets of Jaffa. He observes Vera (Maya Flamm) heading to the set to film a scene with George. Vera plays her grandmother, who is a pregnant British woman in 1940s Palestine, and approaches a Palestinian doctor to have an abortion. The doctor refuses to abort the baby and refers her to a doctor in Tel Aviv. Suddenly the father of the baby, a British soldier, barges into the office and shoots the doctor dead. The scene is reshot, over and over, while Talal watches George's character get dehumanized and shot down multiple times. He follows George out of the set asking why he would let them do that to him. 

The next day of filming, the director Jerry sets out to film a protest scene. He wants raw, authentic footage of the Palestinians protesting against the British soldiers. Talal watches the scene unfold, and joins in with the Palestinian actors protesting though he is not acting. The boy joins the chant with the passion and conviction that the director Jerry is looking for, so he focuses the camera on Talal encouraging his raw behavior. Talal and the actors, who end up following his lead, take the protest off the set and attack Israeli police on the street, leading to Talal's accidental death. The tragedy leaves the family devastated and exposes them as now the police are aware of the children's illegal status. With no mercy, they plan to remove the children while George, Rita, and Doris, protect them till the end.

Cast
Yusuf Abu Warda as George
 Bilal Babai as Ibrahim
 Jihad Babay as Talal
 Ruba Blal as Rita
 Maya Flamm as Vera 
 Johnny Phillips as Jerry 
 Alon Dahan
 Salim Dau

References

External links
 

2019 films
2019 drama films
Israeli drama films
2010s Hebrew-language films